Shashikanth, better known as Bobo Shashi ( : born 12 October 1981) is an Indian film composer and singer.

Biography and career
Shashi was born in Chennai, Tamil Nadu, India to a musically affluent family. His father Murali is a famous composer who composes along with his brother Sabesh as Sabesh–Murali. His uncle Deva is a popular music composer. His cousins are actor Jai and composer Srikanth Deva.

His first movie for which he composed music was Kulir 100° (2009). The soundtrack won critical acclaim. Prior to the movie, he assisted other Indian film composers, such as Srikanth Deva, Sabesh–Murali, Deva, and Vidyasagar. A year later, after his first film released, he started to compose music for Telugu films. His Telugu film debut was Bindaas, followed by Thakita Thakita.

In 2012, Shashi composed the music for Uu Kodathara? Ulikki Padathara?. Out of the six songs he composed in the movie, he composed five (with the sixth being composed by Vidyasagar). In 2016, he composed one song (along with Karunas) from the movie Kadavul Irukaan Kumaru, composed by G. V. Prakash Kumar. In 2018, he composed the music for Jarugandi. In 2022, he composed the music for Hostel.

Filmography

As music director

As singer

References 

http://www.mixss.com/thulli-ezhunthathu-kadhal-mp3-songs-bobo-sashi.html

Living people
1981 births
Musicians from Chennai
Telugu film score composers
Tamil film score composers